Birger Breivik (26 October 1912  –  28 June 1996) was a Norwegian politician for the Christian Democratic Party.

He was born in Fyresdal.

He was elected to the Norwegian Parliament from Aust-Agder in 1958, but was not re-elected in 1961.

References

1912 births
1996 deaths
People from Fyresdal
Christian Democratic Party (Norway) politicians
Members of the Storting
20th-century Norwegian politicians